Savannas Preserve State Park is a Florida State Park, located along much of the Atlantic Coast between Fort Pierce and Jensen Beach.
Savannas Preserve also has a group of youth volunteers, the Junior Friends of Savannas Preserve State Park.

General 
Savannas Preserve State Park is predominantly a savanna; open grasslands with sparse South Florida slash pine trees. The park is made up of pine flatwoods, basin marsh, scrubby flatwoods, wet prairie and the Atlantic scrub ridge. Protecting southeast Florida's largest freshwater marsh, the Savannas Preserve State Park manages over 7,000 acres. It is home to many species, most notably: the threatened Florida scrub jay and gopher tortoise, the American alligator, and the sandhill crane. The park is also the home to a rare plant that only grows in the Savannas Preserve State Park in the world, the savannas mint.

The Savannas Education Center has live exhibits, a gift shop, self-guided tour booklets, and information on many of Florida's State Parks. Interpretive guided tours and canoe/kayak trips are offered by the Friends of Savannas Preserve State Park (a nonprofit citizen's support organization).

Fishing is allowed, there is an equestrian entrance, and biking is permitted (although difficult because of the sand).

This park contains nearly all of the remaining populations of the fragrant prickly-apple (Harrisia fragrans), an endangered cactus species.

The main entrance to Savannas Preserve State Park is located at 2541 SE Walton Road, Port St. Lucie, Florida 34952.

References

External links

 Savannas Preserve State Park at Florida State Parks
 Friends of Savannas Preserve State Park at Friends of Savannas
 Savannas Preserve State Park at Wildernet

State parks of Florida
Parks in St. Lucie County, Florida
Parks in Martin County, Florida
Temperate grasslands, savannas, and shrublands in the United States